The 1895 Rhode Island Rams football team represented the University of Rhode Island in the 1895 college football season. It was the first season in school history. Rhode Island finished the season with a record of 1–1.

Schedule

References

Rhode Island
Rhode Island Rams football seasons
Rhode Island Rams football